Charbari  (Gazarikandi) is a village under Kathalbari and Kukurmara Gaon panchayat in Mankachar revenue circle, South Salmara-Mankachar district of Assam a north east state of India.

Politics

Charbari is the part of Dhubri (Lok Sabha constituency) whose present MP is Badruddin Ajmal,  AIUDF. (as per 2019 elections). And Charbari is included Mankachar (Vidhan Sabha constituency)  of the Assam Legislative Assembly, whose present  MLA is Adv.Aminul Islam, AIUDF. (as per 2021 elections).

Education

 Kukurmara Higher Secondary School 
 Navorashmi Girls High School
 Model Academy, Charbari
 Medulla Jatiya Vidyalaya, Gazarikandi
 Green View Jatiya Vidyalaya, Charbari
 Charbari L.P & M.E School
 Gazarikandi L.P School

Hospitals
 Gazarikandi Block Primary Health Care

Market
 Hasinur Rahman Book Store, Charali

References

Villages in South Salmara-Mankachar district